São Pedro is a village in the southwestern part of the island of Sao Vicente, Cape Verde. It is situated on the south coast, approximately 10 km southwest of the island capital Mindelo. In 2010 its population was 991. Cesária Évora Airport, the island's international airport is directly north of São Pedro. It was mentioned as a small port as "P. St. Pedro" in the 1747 map by Jacques-Nicolas Bellin. The lighthouse Farol de D. Amélia sits on the Ponta Machado, 3 km west of the village.

References

External links
Discover the Lighthouse 

Villages and settlements in São Vicente, Cape Verde
Populated coastal places in Cape Verde